Latymer Upper School Boat Club is a rowing club on the River Thames, based at 40A Upper Mall, Hammersmith, London.

History
The club belongs to Latymer Upper School. The club won the prestigious Diamond Jubilee Challenge Cup at the Henley Regatta in 2013 and 2019 and produced a national champion crew in 2010.

Notable members
Andy Holmes
Jim Clark (coach)
[Alan Watson (olympic oarsman, coach & Henley steward)]

National champions

Honours

Henley Royal Regatta

See also
Rowing on the River Thames

References

Tideway Rowing clubs
Sport in the London Borough of Hounslow
Rowing clubs in England
Rowing clubs of the River Thames
Scholastic rowing in the United Kingdom